Ferdinand Friedrich Schaal (7 February 1889 – 9 October 1962) was a German general during World War II. He commanded the 10th Panzer Division in the 1939 Invasion of Poland and directed the successful Siege of Calais in 1940. Schaal was involved in the unsuccessful 20 July plot against Adolf Hitler; for his participation in the conspiracy, he was imprisoned until the end of the war.

Career

Schaal was born on 7 February 1889 in Freiburg im Breisgau, Baden. In April 1939, as part of the lead-up to the invasion of Poland, Schaal was tapped to lead the new 10th Panzer Division. He continued to command that unit through the invasions of Poland, France, and the USSR. On 16 March 1942, as the 10th Panzer Division returned to France from its bloody tour of the Eastern Front, Schaal was given the command of LVI Panzer Corps, which was also stationed in the Soviet Union. He served in that capacity until 1 August 1943, when he became Wehrmacht commander in the military district of Bohemia and Moravia.

Operation Valkyrie

His role in Operation Valkyrie was to involve subduing the Nazi Party and establishing military control over Bohemia and Moravia. On the evening of 20 July 1944, Schaal waited for clarification on how to proceed from General Friedrich Fromm, a co-conspirator in Berlin. None came, as the assassination attempt had failed and Fromm had decided to betray the other plotters. Schaal was arrested the next day on the orders of Heinrich Himmler and imprisoned. Unlike many members of the German resistance, Schaal avoided execution and survived the war.

Awards

 Knight's Cross of the Iron Cross on 13 July 1940 as Generalleutnant and commander of 10. Panzer-Division

References

Citations

Bibliography

 

1889 births
1962 deaths
Military personnel from Freiburg im Breisgau
German Army personnel of World War I
Generals of Panzer Troops
German resistance members
Recipients of the clasp to the Iron Cross, 1st class
Recipients of the Gold German Cross
Recipients of the Knight's Cross of the Iron Cross
Reichswehr personnel
German Army generals of World War II